An altar call is a tradition in some Christian churches in which those who wish to make a new spiritual commitment to Jesus Christ are invited to come forward publicly. It is so named because the supplicants gather at the altar located at the front of the church building. Most altar calls occur at the end of an evangelical address.

Background 

Altar calls are a recent historic phenomenon beginning in the 1830s in America. During these, people approached the chancel rails, anxious seat, or mourner's bench to pray. One of the most famous 19th century revivalists, Charles Grandison Finney, "popularized the idea of the 'altar call' in order to sign up his converts for the abolition movement." In many Churches of the Wesleyan-Arminian theology, the altar call, in addition to being an invitation for people to experience the New Birth, is also often used to implore believers to experience the second work of grace, known as entire sanctification. Notable examples in history of using altar calls include Billy Sunday and D. L. Moody.

The Reformed Churches object to the use of the altar call for a variety of reasons. They argue that the Bible does not refer to any similar practice. Others believe it is intimidating and therefore creates an unnecessary and artificial barrier to those who would become Christians but are then unwilling to make an immediate public profession under the gaze of an assembly. Others object in that they may mislead people into confusing outward conduct with spiritual change. In doing so, they argue, altar calls may actually give people false assurance about their salvation. In addition, Carey Hardy argues that they change "the essence of the gospel", create believers with false professions of faith, and do not "follow the biblical method for public identification".

See also

Arminianism
Conversion to Christianity
Evangelicalism
Evangelism
Monergism
Regeneration
Sinner's prayer
Synergism
Decision theology

References

External links
Altar Call Evangelism by Paul Alexander
The 'Altar Call' Is it helpful or harmful? by Fred G. Zaspel
Altar Call by G. I. Williamson
How to Botch an Altar Call - adapted from Becoming an Emissary for God by Allen Atzbi
 The new altar call.(HEATS & MINDS) (Poverty): An article from: Sojourners Magazine

Evangelical ecclesiology
Conversion to Christianity
Christian terminology